The 2015 Bolton Metropolitan Borough Council election was held on 7 May 2015 to elect members of Bolton Metropolitan Borough Council in Greater Manchester, England. This took place on the same day as other local elections

22 seats were contested, including 2 seats in the Heaton and Lostock ward following the retirement of Conservative Councillor Alan Rushton, and 2 seats in Westhoughton North following the resignation of Labour Councillor Sean Harkin. The Labour Party won 14 seats, the Conservatives won 6 seats, UKIP won 1 seat and the Liberal Democrats won 1 seat.

After the election, the total composition of the council was as follows:
Labour 39
Conservative 15
UK Independence Party 3
Liberal Democrats 3.

Election result

Council Composition
Prior to the election the composition of the council was:

After the election the composition of the council was:

LD - Liberal Democrats
U - UKIP

Ward results

Astley Bridge ward

Bradshaw ward

Breightmet ward

Bromley Cross ward

Crompton ward

Farnworth ward

Great Lever ward

Halliwell ward

Harper Green ward

Heaton and Lostock ward 
Two seats were up for election in this ward.

Horwich and Blackrod ward

Horwich North East ward

Hulton ward

Kearsley ward

Little Lever and Darcy Lever ward

Rumworth ward

Smithills ward

Tonge with the Haulgh ward

Westhoughton North and Chew Moor ward 
Two seats were up for election in this ward.

Westhoughton South ward

Notes

References

2015 English local elections
May 2015 events in the United Kingdom
2015
2010s in Greater Manchester